Soap was the brand name of shoes made for grinding, similar to aggressive inline skating. They were introduced by Chris Morris of Artemis Innovations Inc. with the brand name "Soap" in 1997. They have a plastic concavity in the sole, which allows the wearer to grind on objects such as pipes, handrails and stone ledges. The company and its product rapidly gained popularity through fansites, a video game and live demonstrations. Soap fell to legal vulnerabilities and was sold twice, eventually bringing the brand to Heeling Sports Limited.

History
Soap shoes were essentially derived from rollerblades and aggressive skating.  Chris Morris, a resident of California who worked at RollerBlade in Torrance for over sixteen years, worked to customize a simple shoe that had a ground plate embedded in the sole.  The shoe was an average Nike, fitted for sliding.

Concept 21 (a recently founded design firm) was called upon to design a sample so that the product could be finalized. They then formed Artemis Innovations, which would be the company the brand would be sold under for four years. In 2001, Mr. Morris lost control of the Soap license through legal problems. Activity within the company slowed down, and eventually, the remaining executives sold Soap.

In-Stride, a company whose target market was primarily wrestling gear, purchased Soap. In-Stride went bankrupt in late 2002, and Soap was once again available for purchase.

Heeling Sports Limited, the company behind the shoes with a wheel in the sole known as Heelys, realized that the ground plate could be very profitable when paired with their wheel, and acquired Soap later that year. In early 2003, six new Soap shoes were released, each in multiple color schemes; simultaneously, HSL was designing hybrid shoes to sell under the Heelys brand. HSL has been criticized for releasing too many new models at a single time, and not supplying requested stock to retailers frequently enough.  There are currently no models of Soap shoes being produced by HSL.

The sport never caught on to the mass market in comparison to, for instance, skateboarding, but the brand "Soap" did have a professional team mostly consisting of former professional inline skaters such as Ryan Jaunzemis, Bryndon Smith, Danny Lynch, Paul Cifuentes, Eddie Ramirez, and Ben Kelly (Head of Research & Development, and Soap Shoes' wear-testing team). Soap's heyday was in the late 1990s and early 2000s. when competing crews from across the Americas and Europe were releasing internet videos, spurring an online community of "Soapers."  These crews have since disbanded along with the website forums, and now there are few proponents left such as solidgrind.com run by Former Soap team captain Derek Brooks and the Melbourne soapers Facebook Page run by Soap Collector Greg Crellin.

A revival of sorts was noticed in early 2006 as more people were attracted to Soaping, and HSL responded by re-releasing their Express model in limited quantities. Soap Shoes continue to sluggishly regain popularity despite some difficulty due to Heelys using grind plates in addition to their wheels. That was until the recession had hit, which affected HSL significantly. Heelys stock was once 38 dollars per share, and on August 8, 2007, Heelys lost half of its stock value in a single day, falling from $21.99 to $11.42. Now former CEO Michael Staffaroni at the time was expecting significant growth despite the stock plummet.

Soap Shoes at the time managed to have a very successful demo at Xtreme Wheels Skate Park despite HSL's financial problems. A year later, the Soap Shoes Express was discontinued by HSL and liquidation for Soap Shoes began, with representatives from Heelys claiming to "just throw out" anything that was left over. Within a matter of five years, Heelys stock had sunk down to $2.25 per share and was sold to Sequential Brand Group for $63.2 million, taking the soap and other grind shoe patents with it.

Soap shoes in Sonic the Hedgehog
Soap shoes were featured in the video game Sonic Adventure 2, developed by Sonic Team USA in San Francisco. This game presented many billboards, blimps, and benches advertising the shoes; also, Sonic wore a custom version of the Scorcher/Nitro shoes exclusive to the title, while the darker character Shadow wears hybrid jet hoverskate/grind shoes, as grinding (or "soaping") debuted as an important new gameplay element. Grinding remains a core element in recent Sonic games, though officially licensed Soap shoes have given way to the titular character's normal shoes. Soap shoes made their reappearance in Sonic Forces as an unlockable accessory for the Avatar and come in three different colors, one of the colors matching the ones used in Sonic Adventure 2. Soap shoes also appear in Sonic Frontiers as a Bonus DLC for signing up for the Sonic Frontiers newsletter.

Pending the sale of Soap to In-Stride and later HSL, no actions were taken for the continuation of the partnership. However, in two episodes of the anime Sonic X, Sonic's Soap shoes are brought in to give him an advantage over his enemies. The HD re-release of Sonic Adventure 2 retained all of the in-game advertisements, but the Soap shoes advertisements were removed.

References

External links
 Archived Official Website
Shoe companies of the United States
Sporting goods manufacturers of the United States
Clothing companies established in 1997
Athletic shoe brands
Companies based in Carrollton, Texas